Mehran is a given name and surname of Persian origin.

Given name 
 Mehran Ghassemi (1977–2008), Iranian journalist
 Mehran Maham (born 1969), Iranian film producer
 Mehran Marri (born 1973), Pakistani Army leader
 Mehran Modiri (born 1967), Iranian filmmaker, actor, singer
 Mehran Mumtaz (born 2003), Pakistani cricketer
 Mehran Karimi Nasseri (1945–2022), Iranian refugee who lived in Charles de Gaulle Airport from 1988 until 2006
 Mehran Rajabi (born 1961), Iranian actor
 Mehran Sahami (fl. 1990s–2010s), Iranian-born American computer scientist

Surname
 Alireza Mehran (fl. 1970s), Iranian academic, former chancellor of Sharif University of Technology
 Hassan Ali Mehran (born 1937), Iranian economist
 Laleh Mehran (born 1968), Iranian-born American new media artist 
 Mark Whitney Mehran (fl. 1990s–2000s), American businessman
 Marsha Mehran (1977–2014), Iranian novelist
 Roxana Mehran (fl. 1980s–2020s), Iranian-born American cardiologist
 Sam Mehran (1985–2018), American-Australian musician, songwriter, and producer

See also 
 Mehran (disambiguation)

Persian masculine given names